Hope and Despair in the American City: Why There Are No Bad Schools in Raleigh is a 2009 book by Gerald Grant, published by Harvard University Press.

The book's argument is that the Wake County School District of Raleigh, North Carolina has a more functional public school system than the Syracuse City School District because the former has merged economically disparate areas in the same school system and has socioeconomically balanced enrollment at its schools. Grant stated that political decisions and not what Grant describes as "conscious racism" damaged the Syracuse district. In the words of Richard Arum of New York University, Grant argued that the Wake County district was "exemplary".

The subtitle of the book refers to a saying that was made after the Wake County district, formed from a previous inner city and a previous suburban school district to merge socioeconomic and racial groups, was created.

Regina Smardon described the work as both "a masterful ethnographic survey" and a "brilliant demographic analysis".

Background
Grant originated from Syracuse, New York. He had his high school education in that city. He later worked for the Washington Post in writing articles about education, then got into a PhD program at the Harvard Graduate School of Education, which he completed, and began working for Syracuse University as a professor.

Contents
The use of Syracuse as the counterexample is done to show how de facto educational segregation is prevalent in the northern United States.

Reception
Arum concluded that the book is "a compelling historical account." Arum argued that the author should have put more focus on student tracking done in Wake County; the author asserted that standards were maintained in classes for students on lower levels of tracking. 

Smardon, who graduated from the Syracuse district, stated that the book explained to her "nagging questions" about academic failure in that district.

Publishers Weekly described it as "a must-read for anyone interested in" the book's respective fields.

See also
 The World We Created at Hamilton High - Another book by Grant
 The End of Consensus - A book about the disestablishment of the socioeconomic balancing program in Wake County

References
 
 
  - See article at Gale Academic Onefile

Notes

Further reading
 Reviews
 
 
 
 
 
 

 Other

External links
 Hope and Despair in the American City - Harvard University Press
 Hope and Despair in the American City: Why There Are No Bad Schools in Raleigh - Available at JSTOR

2009 books
Harvard University Press books
Books about New York (state)
Syracuse, New York
Raleigh, North Carolina
Wake County, North Carolina
Books about North Carolina